Alex Børger (born 15 July 1939) is a Danish wrestler. He competed in the men's Greco-Roman 52 kg at the 1968 Summer Olympics.

References

External links
 

1939 births
Living people
Danish male sport wrestlers
Olympic wrestlers of Denmark
Wrestlers at the 1968 Summer Olympics
Sportspeople from Copenhagen
20th-century Danish people